Masoud Zarei (born August 25, 1981 in Tehran, Iran) is an Iranian footballer, currently a member of the IPL club Mes Kerman.

Club career

Club career Statistics
Last Update 16 December 2009 

 Assist Goals

Honours
Azadegan League
Winner: 1
2003/04 with Saba Battery
Hazfi Cup
Winner: 1
2005 with Saba Battery
Iran's Premier Football League
Winner: 1
2007/08 with Persepolis

External links
 

1981 births
Living people
Saba players
Iranian footballers
Persepolis F.C. players
Sanat Mes Kerman F.C. players
Association football defenders